The Burke Act (1906), formally known as the General Allotment Act Amendment of 1906 and also called the Forced Fee Patenting Act, amended the Dawes Act of 1887 under which the communal land held by tribes on the Indian reservations was broken up and distributed in severalty to individual households of tribal members. It required the government to assess whether individuals were "competent and capable" before giving them fee simple patents to their allotted land.

Because the federal government believed that many Indians were not prepared for United States citizenship, the act further provided that citizenship not be granted to Native American individuals until at the time of the final validation of their trust patents instead of upon the receipt of the trust patents, as stated in the Dawes Act. Those who were issued fee simple patents were granted citizenship upon receipt. Those whose land remained in trust status were to be granted citizenship at the conclusion of the twenty-five year trust period.

It was named for U. S. Congressman Charles H. Burke.

Background

Competence
The Burke Act amended the GAA to provide for the Secretary of the Interior to assess individual Native Americans as ‘competent and capable.’ before issuing any person receiving a land allotment a patent in fee simple. Receiving a fee simple patent meant that the land of the allotee would be removed from federal trust status and made subject to taxation. The allotee would be able to sell it on the private market.

The act reads:
“..the Secretary of the Interior may, in his discretion, and he is hereby authorized, whenever he shall be satisfied that any Indian allottee is competent and capable of managing his or her affairs at any time to cause to be issued to such allottee a patent in fee simple, and thereafter all restrictions as to sale, incumbrance [sic], or taxation of said land shall be removed.”

Studies have shown that Bureau of Indian Affairs officials tended first to classify people as 'competent and capable' if they were of mixed-race (with some European ancestry). These allottees were deemed ‘competent’ because BIA officials believed that their European ancestry made them mentally superior, that they were more likely to be assimilated culturally, and therefore they were able to take responsibility of their land.

Allowing officials to assess competence made administration of the act more subjective, increasing the exclusionary power of the Secretary of Interior and inviting corruption among those with an opportunity to profit by gaining Indian-owned land.  Although the act gave power to the allotee to decide whether to keep or sell the land, provided the harsh economic reality of the time, and lack of access by many Native Americans on reservations to credit and markets, liquidation of Indian-owned lands was almost inevitable.  The Department of Interior officials associated with this program expected that virtually 95% of fee patented land would eventually be sold to whites.

The following passage from the 1913 annual report from the Pine Ridge Indian Reservation reveals that the supervisor of the reservation expected eventual dispossession of land after individual Lakota people had been issued fee patent. The Bureau of Indian Affairs (BIA) reservation superintendent characterized this result as a ‘valuable lesson.’ 
“It is still the conviction of this office that the issue of a patent in fee for a portion of an Indian’s land who is judged as being competent or near-competent, is the proper procedure in dealing with the land question among the Indians… Even if the proceeds derived from the dispossession of the land are squandered he still has plenty of land left and he may have learned a few lessons that will prove of value in the future.” (Department of the Interior, Annual Report of the Pine Ridge Agency, SD, August 1, 1913)

The Burke Act had other consequences. In some cases, individual Indians deemed "competent" were not notified of the status and were not informed that their land's status had shifted from trust land to fee patent. As a result, individual owners did not realize the land was subject to taxation. After a period of taxes being unpaid, local or state jurisdictions could sell the land without the owner's consent to pay past taxes. This process was known as the "forced fee patent process." In this way, the Burke Act contributed to the ongoing fractionation of lands within reservation boundaries and overall loss of Tribal or Indian-owned lands.

References

 James Truslow Adams, Dictionary of American History, New York: Charles Scribner's Sons, 1940
 Paul Robertson, The Power of the Land, University of Nebraska Press, 2002

Further reading
 

United States federal Native American legislation
1906 in American law
United States nationality law